The Judge is a 1984 French crime drama film directed by Philippe Lefebvre.
The film was shown at the 1984 Mystfest where it was nominated in the category of Best Picture.

Cast

References

External links

1984 films
1980s French-language films
1984 crime drama films
Films scored by Luis Bacalov
Films set in the 1970s
French crime drama films
1980s French films